Phoong Jin Zhe (Pha̍k-fa-sṳ: Phùng Tsin-chet born 3 January 1989) also known as Ginger Phoong is a Malaysian politician who has served as the State Minister of Industrial and Entrepreneur Development of Sabah in the Gabungan Rakyat Sabah (GRS) state administration under Chief Minister Hajiji Noor since January 2023 and Member of the Sabah State Legislative Assembly (MLA) for Luyang since May 2018. He served as the State Minister of Youth and Sports of Sabah in the Heritage Party (WARISAN) administration under former Chief Minister Shafie Apdal from May 2019 to the collapse of the WARISAN administration in September 2020. He is a member of the Democratic Action Party (DAP), a component party of the Pakatan Harapan (PH) coalition. He is also the Youth Chief of DAP of Sabah or known as Chief of the DAP Socialist Youth, the youth wing of the party, of Sabah.

Election results

References

Members of the Sabah State Legislative Assembly
Democratic Action Party (Malaysia) politicians
Living people
1989 births